The Comedian Thailand is a 24-hour Reality show based on teaching contestants the art of comedy; a combination of Thai cultural background and modern comedy makes the program undeniably unique.
One of the most challenging forms of entertainment is creating laughter. The program aims to prove that not all comedians are born to be, and that one can actually be taught. In order to prove this theory, “The Comedian Thailand”, Thailand's first ever “Comedy-Reality-Contest-Show” came to life, to find “The Ultimate Entertainer”, who can sing, dance and create laughter.

Contestants

Elimination chart

References

Thai reality television series
2013 Thai television series debuts
2013 Thai television series endings
2010s Thai television series
Channel 7 (Thailand) original programming